The Bașca is a right tributary of the river Uz in Romania. It flows into the Uz upstream from Valea Uzului.

References

Rivers of Romania
Rivers of Harghita County